Travis James Mulock (born June 25, 1985) is a Canadian-German professional ice hockey forward currently an unrestricted free agent. He most recently played with the Straubing Tigers of the Deutsche Eishockey Liga (DEL).

Playing career
Mulock played junior ice hockey with the Vancouver Giants of the Western Hockey League during the 2001–02 and 2002–03 seasons. The next year he joined the Regina Pats. During the next two seasons he played with the Surrey Eagles of the British Columbia Hockey League. He played his final season of junior hockey in 2005–06 with the Kamloops Blazers. After six season of juniors, Mulock joined Bad Toelz EC of the German third-tier Oberliga. He played with Bad Tölz for three seasons before joining Eisbären Berlin of the German elite league Deutsche Eishockey Liga (DEL) in 2009. In his first season with Berlin in 2009–10, Mulock scored 20 goals to be selected as the DEL's rookie of the year. He won three straight German championships with the Eisbären squad from 2011 to 2013.

Mulock left Berlin after the 2015–16 season and signed a one-year contract with fellow DEL side Kölner Haie on April 20, 2016. Used primarily in a defensive checking role, Mulock recorded a career low in registering just 2 goals and 9 points in 46 games during the 2017–18 season.

On April 23, 2018, Mulock as a free agent signed a one-year contract to continue in the DEL with the Straubing Tigers.

International play
Mulock was selected to play for the German national team at the 2010 Winter Olympics in Vancouver, close to his hometown of Langley. As a Canadian, he was eligible to compete with the German team having played exclusively in Germany for more than two seasons and because he holds dual citizenship to Canada and Germany.

Personal life 
His brother Tyson Mulock is also a professional ice hockey player. Their grandfather Horst emigrated from Germany to Canada after World War II.

Career statistics

Regular season and playoffs

International

References

External links

1985 births
Canadian ice hockey right wingers
Eisbären Berlin players
Ice hockey players at the 2010 Winter Olympics
Kamloops Blazers players
Kölner Haie players
Living people
Olympic ice hockey players of Germany
Regina Pats players
Straubing Tigers players
Surrey Eagles players
EC Bad Tölz players
Vancouver Giants players
Canadian expatriate ice hockey players in Germany